Trepobates vazquezae is a species of water strider in the family Gerridae. It is found on the west coast of Mexico from Nayarit to Guerrero.

References

Trepobatinae
Insects described in 1951